Hello Lovers is an album by Japanese singer Misato Watanabe. It was released on July 8, 1992 by Sony Music Japan.

Track listing
 "Lovin' You"
 "泣いちゃいそうだよ"
 "やるじゃん女の子"
 "サマータイム ブルース"
 "ムーンライト ダンス"
 "跳べ模型ヒコーキ"
 "My Revolution－第2章－"
 "シャララ"
 "Growing Up"
 "さくらの花の咲くころに"
 "青空"
 "男の子のように"

External links
 Sony Music Entertainment - Official site for Watanabe Misato.
 Album Page - Direct link to page with song listing and music samples.

1992 albums
Misato Watanabe albums
Sony Music Entertainment Japan albums